Klimontów may refer to the following places in Poland:
Klimontów, Jędrzejów County in Świętokrzyskie Voivodeship (south-central Poland)
Klimontów, Sandomierz County in Świętokrzyskie Voivodeship (south-central Poland)
Klimontów, Lower Silesian Voivodeship (south-west Poland)
Klimontów, Lesser Poland Voivodeship (south Poland)
 , formerly a city, now a district of Sosnowiec, Zagłębie Dąbrowskie, southern Poland